The South-Western Region is one of the 10 administrative regions in which Venezuela is divided for   development planning; it comprises the state of Táchira and the Páez Municipality of Apure State.

Regions of Venezuela